The 2002 UK & Ireland Greyhound Racing Year was the 76th year of greyhound racing in the United Kingdom and Ireland.

Roll of honour

Summary
The National Greyhound Racing Club (NGRC) released the annual returns, with totalisator turnover at £92,723,060 from 6190 meetings.

Droopys Rhys trained by Ted Soppitt was voted Greyhound of the Year. The blue dog had finished third in the Scottish Greyhound Derby behind Priceless Rebel before travelling to Ireland and staying with Reggie Roberts when finishing runner up in the Irish Greyhound Derby behind Bypass Byway. He had missed the English Derby before winning the Steel City Cup and Select Stakes. It had transpired that during that Irish Derby final Droopys Rhys had sustained a fracture on the hock and was later retired. Linda Jones was voted Greyhound Trainer of the Year for the second successive year.

An opportunity was missed by the track promoters as the British Greyhound Racing Board announced they were looking for a 'New Deal'. The BGR Fund stood at £5 million and the BGRB headed by Chief Executive Geoffrey Thomas demanded a better deal, they drew up controversial plans to control the intellectual property rights and a continued battle ensued. The Bookmakers Afternoon Greyhound Service were unwilling to pay more and significantly increased the prize money at the bookmaker owned tracks in an attempt to combat the threat of property rights. William Hill also bought their first greyhound track after securing a deal for Sunderland; a move seen as a consequence of the politics surrounding the 'New Deal'. Tracks fearing losing their BAGS contract eventually backed down leaving the industry dependent on bookmaker contributions. The dispute continued with regular bitter racing press headlines, the deal eventually died.

Tracks
The BS Group took over from Allied Presentations at Reading to add to their portfolio of tracks that included Swindon, Milton Keynes and Poole.

News
Australian stud dogs have a major influence in the breeding lines, Top Honcho an Australian born black dog became the top sire for the second year running. This further damaged the English breeding and Australian lines very often crossed which could be a problem. Racing Managers also noticed that Australian bred greyhounds brought a lack of track craft and lack of wide runners. Floyd Amphlett had predicted the Australian invasion way back in 1993.

Charlie Lister suffered a suspected stroke, his head lad Chris Akers took on extra responsibilities at the Newark kennels. Seamus Cahill and Bernie Doyle both joined Wimbledon from Catford and Reading respectively. Kelly Mullins became the third son of former champion trainer Linda Mullins to enter the training ranks, he acquired kennels near Slough and began training in April.

Competitions
The Ladbrokes Summer Stayers Classic was introduced at Monmore with a £7,500 to the winner and £12,000 total prize money giving it Category One status, there were now 34 races listed as category one, a remarkable difference from the original ten classics. The Scottish Greyhound Derby at Shawfield Stadium increased their first prize to £25,000 giving the event the second biggest reward behind the English Derby. Jonathan Hobbs of the Racing Post is instrumental in producing a successful greyhound annual.

Top Savings won the Juvenile by 8¾ lengths. Allen Gift made the Scurry Gold Cup final at Catford but had to be withdrawn, the race was won by Patsy Byrne's Letter Slippy. Allen Gift never found form again and the Derby champion had the injustice of losing in graded races at home track Hove towards the end of his career. 

Brian Clemenson won his first trainers championship before dominating the Cesarewitch with three finalists and the 4-5 favourite Cuba duly won. Cuba finished runner up to Sheriff Bow Wow in the Grand Prix final at Walthamstow. Sheriff Bow Wow in turn finished runner up to Alibuk Lad in the St Leger final.

Ireland
Compared to 2001 the Irish year was relatively quiet despite the star greyhound Late Late Show winning the early season BCR Press Easter Cup. By the time he made an attempt at the Derby he was passed his best form; the Derby went to Bypass Byway who was duly voted Irish Dog of the Year.

Principal UK races

Principal Irish finals

Totalisator returns

The totalisator returns declared to the National Greyhound Racing Club for the year 2002 are listed below.

References 

Greyhound racing in the United Kingdom
Greyhound racing in the Republic of Ireland
UK and Ireland Greyhound Racing Year
UK and Ireland Greyhound Racing Year
UK and Ireland Greyhound Racing Year
UK and Ireland Greyhound Racing Year